Tyspanodes is a genus of moths of the family Crambidae described by William Warren in 1891.

Species
Tyspanodes albidalis Hampson, 1912
Tyspanodes cardinalis Hampson, 1896
Tyspanodes celebensis Munroe, 1960
Tyspanodes creaghi Hampson, 1898
Tyspanodes exathesalis (Walker, 1859)
Tyspanodes fascialis (Moore, 1867)
Tyspanodes flaviventer Warren, 1891
Tyspanodes flavolimbalis (Snellen, 1895)
Tyspanodes gracilis Inoue, 1982
Tyspanodes hemileucalis (Hampson, 1897)
Tyspanodes hillalis (Schaus, 1927)
Tyspanodes hypsalis Warren, 1891
Tyspanodes linealis Moore, 1867
Tyspanodes metachrysialis Lower, 1903
Tyspanodes nigrolinealis Moore, 1867
Tyspanodes obscuralis Caradja, 1925
Tyspanodes piuralis Schaus, 1920
Tyspanodes radiata (Kenrick, 1907)
Tyspanodes striata (Butler, 1879)
Tyspanodes suasalis Druce, 1899

References

Spilomelinae
Crambidae genera
Taxa named by William Warren (entomologist)